Virudhunagar District is a district (an administrative district) of Tamil Nadu state in south India. Virudhunagar is the district headquarters of Virudhunagar district. Virudhunagar district was formed by the separation of Old Ramanathapuram District in 1987 into Ramanathapuram District, Sivagangai District and the west part as Virudhunagar District. Virudhunagar District was formerly called Karmavirer Kamarajar District. As of 2011, Virudhunagar district had a population of 1,942,288 with a sex-ratio of 1,007 females for every 1,000 males. Sivakasi is the most populous and largest city in the district.

Demographics

According to 2011 census, Virudhunagar district had a population of 1,942,288, up from 1,751,301 in 2001, or about an 11% increase. The sex-ratio was 1,007 females for every 1,000 males, much above the national average of 929, but down from 1,012 in 2001. A total of 197,134 were under the age of six, constituting 100,827 males and 96,307 females. Scheduled Castes and Scheduled Tribes accounted for 20.59% and 0.12% of the population, respectively. The average literacy of the district was 72.02%, compared to the national average of 72.99%. The district had a total of 537,748 households. There were a total of 950,158 workers, comprising 52,361 cultivators, 168,174 main agricultural labourers, 30,292 in house hold industries, 603,239 other workers, 96,092 marginal workers, 4,792 marginal cultivators, 40,528 marginal agricultural labourers, 5,006 marginal workers in household industries and 45,766 other marginal workers.

Location

The district is bounded by Sivagangai district and Madurai district on the north, Tenkasi district and Tuticorin District to the south and Ramanathapuram District on east Theni district to the northwest and Idukki district of Kerala to the west.

Politics  

|}

Administration
The district is divided into three revenue divisions - Sivakasi, Sattur and Aruppukottai.

The district comprises ten taluks: Aruppukkottai, Kariapatti, Rajapalayam, Sattur, Sivakasi, Srivilliputhur, Tiruchuli, Vembakottai, Virudhunagar and Watrap. In total there are 600 revenue villages in this district.

This district has nine town panchayats – Seithur, Vathirairuppu, Chettiarpatti, Kariapatti, Mamsapuram, Sundarapandiam, Mallankinaru, S.Kodikulam and W.Pudupatti.

The Parliamentary Constituency number of Virudhunagar District is 34.

Economy
Virudhunagar district is leading in the country in the match industry, fireworks and printing, mostly concentrated in and around Sivakasi. Virudhunagar is the main market for oil, chicory, coffee seeds, dry chillies and pulses. There are two trade centres (Godowns) in the District one in Virudhunagar and another in Rajapalayam. Ginning factories, spinning mills, power loom and hand loom industries are also present in the district at Rajapalayam the second big weaving town in the state after Coimbatore. One of the cement plants of Ramco Cements Ltd is located in RR Nagar near Viudhunagar another one located at Alankulam of Sivakasi Taluk.

See also

Villages in Virudhunagar district
Kallamanaickerpatti
List of districts of Tamil Nadu

References

External links

Virudhunagar District official website
Website for Virudhunagar

 
Districts of Tamil Nadu
1987 establishments in Tamil Nadu